Juha Salminen (born 27 September 1976 in Vantaa) is a Finnish former professional motorcycle enduro racer. He is a 13-time World Enduro Champion (including the overall world championship titles from 2000 to 2004) and has also won the German championship (1998) and the Spanish championship (2000–2002).

He also competed in motocross, where he won the Finnish championship in 2002, and endurocross, where he won four times the Barcelona Indoor Enduro in 2000, 2001, 2002 and 2004. In addition to his personal titles, Salminen is a six-time winner of the International Six Days Enduro (ISDE) World Trophy with Team Finland. In 2020, Salminen was named an FIM Enduro Legend.

Racing career

Riding for KTM, Salminen won six world titles in a row from 1999 to 2004. After the 2004 season, he wanted a new challenge and moved to the United States to ride for KTM in the Grand National Cross Country series. He won nine of the series' thirteen races and became the GNCC champion in his debut year. He was crowned both "AMA
Amateur Athlete of the Year" and "GNCC Rider of the Year", chosen by fellow competitors. In 2006, Salminen clinched his second GNCC title at the Yadkin Valley Stomp GNCC in Yadkinville, North Carolina.

Salminen returned to the World Enduro Championship for the 2007 season, with David Knight replacing him in the KTM factory team in the US. Salminen won the first twelve races of the season, but had to miss out the Slovakian rounds due to breaking his collarbone in a British championship race in Britain. He returned to race for the season-ending rounds in France and secured his 12th world title. In the 2008 season, Salminen won nine of the sixteen rounds and broke compatriot Kari Tiainen's record (77) for most wins in the world championship. However, a retirement in the first Spanish round proved costly for his title chase, and Yamaha's Johnny Aubert became the first man to beat Salminen to the title since the 1998 season.

For the 2009 season, Salminen signed a three-year contract with the new BMW factory team. As BMW withdrew from the championship after non-satisfactory results, Salminen moved to Husqvarna for 2011 and won a record eighth class title.

Career summary

ISDE

References

External links

 Official website

1976 births
Enduro riders
Finnish motorcycle racers
Finnish motocross riders
Living people
Sportspeople from Vantaa